A hamburger is a sandwich that consists of a patty of ground meat, usually beef, and other items.

Hamburger may also refer to:

Food
 British English term for a patty
 American term for ground beef
 Hamburger steak, a type of plated dinner

Hamburg, Germany
 Hamburger, a native or inhabitant of the city of Hamburg
 Hamburger SV, a football team in Hamburg
 Der Hamburger und Germania Ruder Club, a rowing club in Hamburg

People
 Hamburger (surname)
 "Hamburger" Jones, American writer and comedian
 Professor Von Hamburger, a character in the Jets'n'Guns computer game

Other uses
 Hamburger, a 1982 arcade video game that was later renamed to BurgerTime
 Hamburger button, a graphical button that resembles a hamburger
 Hamburger: The Motion Picture, a 1986 comedy movie
 Hamburger, a Zebra moray eel in the American television series FishCenter Live
 Hamburger (album), a 2000 compilation album by The Muffs
 Hamburger's Department Store, Los Angeles 1881–1925, became May Company California

See also

 
 List of hamburger restaurants
 List of hamburgers
 $100 hamburger
 Hamburg (disambiguation)
 Hamburgh (disambiguation)
 Burger (disambiguation)